The 2000 Toledo Rockets football team represented the University of Toledo during the 2000 NCAA Division I-A football season. They competed as a member of the Mid-American Conference (MAC) in the West Division. The Rockets were led by head coach Gary Pinkel, who left the school after the end of the season to coach at Missouri.

Schedule

Roster

Rankings

References

Toledo
Toledo Rockets football seasons
Toledo Rockets football